Heart 102.6 may refer to:

 Heart South in Witney, Oxfordshire
 Heart Chelmsford in Chelmsford
 Heart Somerset in Somerset and North Somerset